Armando "Al" Alvarez (October 5, 1912 – March 17, 1995) was an Argentine professional basketball player. He played in the United States' National Basketball League for the Toledo Jim White Chevrolets in four games during the 1941–42 season averaged 5.3 points per game.

References

External links 
Hall of Fame profile for the University of Toledo

1912 births
1995 deaths
Argentine men's basketball players
Argentine expatriate basketball people in the United States
Guards (basketball)
Basketball players from Akron, Ohio
Basketball players from Buenos Aires
Toledo Jim White Chevrolets players
Toledo Rockets baseball players
Toledo Rockets men's basketball players
American men's basketball players